Charles Mayberry Kimbrough (May 23, 1936 – January 11, 2023) was an American actor, best known for his role as the straight-faced anchorman Jim Dial on Murphy Brown. In 1990, his performance in the role earned him a nomination for an Emmy Award for "Outstanding Supporting Actor in a Comedy Series".

Biography 
Born in St. Paul, Minnesota, Kimbrough had extensive stage experience. He studied theater and drama at Indiana University Bloomington, and graduated in 1958. He earned a Masters of Fine Arts degree at Yale University's School of Drama. During the late 1960s and early 1970s, Kimbrough and his first wife Mary Jane Wilson were part of the resident company of the Milwaukee Repertory Theatre where they appeared in such plays as Georges Feydeau's Cat Among the Pigeons and Jules Feiffer's The White House Murder Case. In 1971, he was nominated for a Tony for best featured actor in a musical as Harry in Stephen Sondheim's Company. In 1984, he performed in the original Broadway cast of Sondheim's Sunday in the Park with George. He starred in the original Off-Broadway production of A.R. Gurney's comedy Sylvia in 1985.

Around 1976–1977, he appeared in a Chef Boyardee Spaghetti & Meatballs commercial.

In 1988, Kimbrough was cast as Jim Dial, a veteran network news anchor with the integrity and experience of an Edward R. Murrow or Walter Cronkite, on the CBS sitcom Murphy Brown. The series ran for 247 episodes over ten seasons, winning 17 Emmy Awards and three Golden Globes. Kimbrough was nominated for a Primetime Emmy Award for Outstanding Supporting Actor in a Comedy Series in 1990.

In 1996, he voiced Victor, a gargoyle, in Disney's animated feature The Hunchback of Notre Dame, a role he reprised in its direct-to-video sequel, The Hunchback of Notre Dame II and Kingdom Hearts 3D: Dream Drop Distance.

Kimbrough was part of the cast of the Roundabout Theater Company's 2012 Broadway revival of Mary Chase's Pulitzer prize-winning play Harvey playing William R. Chumley, M.D., with Jim Parsons in the lead as Elwood P. Dowd. The show ran from June 14 to August 5, 2012, at New York's Studio 54 Theatre.

The 2018 revival of Murphy Brown had Kimbrough return playing a retired Jim Dial for a multi-episode arc.

Personal life and death
In 2002, Kimbrough married to actress and fellow Company castmate Beth Howland, known for her television work as Vera Louise Gorman-Novak on the sitcom Alice. Howland died of lung cancer in December 2015 at the age of 76. Her death was not reported to the media until May 24, 2016.

Kimbrough's son, John, founded, sang and played guitar for the St. Paul-based alternative rock band Walt Mink.

Kimbrough died in Culver City, California, on January 11, 2023, at the age of 86.

Filmography

Video games

References

External links 
 
 
 

1936 births
2023 deaths
20th-century American male actors
21st-century American male actors
American male film actors
American male musical theatre actors
American male television actors
American male video game actors
American male voice actors
Indiana University alumni
Male actors from Saint Paul, Minnesota